Christine Lipinska (born 13 May 1951) is a French film director and screenwriter.

Filmography
 Je suis Pierre Rivière (1976)
 Folie suisse (1985)
 Papa est parti, maman aussi (1989)
 Le cahier volé (1993)

See also
 List of female film and television directors
 List of LGBT-related films directed by women

References

External links

1951 births
Living people
French film directors
French women film directors
French women screenwriters
French screenwriters